Tranny is a derogatory term for a trans person.

Tranny or trannie may also refer to:

Technology
Transformer, an electrical device
Transistor radio, a small portable radio receiver using transistor-based circuitry
Transmission (mechanics), a component of a motor vehicle
Ford Transit (slang), a range of Ford panel vans, minibuses, and pickup trucks
Photographic transparency, made using reversal film

Other uses
Middlesbrough Transporter Bridge, a bridge across the River Tees, England
 Transition, the rounded section of the sidewall of a half-pipe used for skating, skiing, snowboarding, telemarking
 Tranny: Confessions of Punk Rock's Most Infamous Anarchist Sellout, a memoir by Laura Jane Grace
 Tranny Lee Gaddy (1894–1975), American football player and coach

See also